Geraki may refer to the following places in Greece:

Geraki, Elis, a village in Elis
Geraki, Heraklion, a village in the municipal unit Kastelli, Crete
Geraki, Laconia, a village in the municipal unit Geronthres, Laconia
 Barony of Geraki, a medieval lordship named after the village

See also

Gerakas
Gerakari (disambiguation)
Gerakini